Schorn is a surname. Notable people with the surname include:

Albert Schorn, German sprint canoeist 
Christine Schorn (born 1944), German actress
Daniel Schorn (born 1988), Austrian road bicycle racer
Karl Schorn (1803-1850), German painter and chess player
Steffen Schorn (born 1967), German jazz musician